Zar Gul Khan is a Pakistani politician who had been a Member of the Provincial Assembly of Khyber Pakhtunkhwa, from April 2017 to May 2018.

Political career

He was elected unopposed to the Provincial Assembly of Khyber Pakhtunkhwa as a candidate of Pakistan Tehreek-e-Insaf (PTI) from Constituency PK-62 Kohistan-II in by-polls held in April 2017.

He ran for the seat of the National Assembly of Pakistan as a candidate of PTI from Constituency NA-14 (Mansehra-cum-Torghar) in 2018 Pakistani general election but was unsuccessful. He received 59,638 votes and lost the seat to Muhammad Sajjad Awan.

References

Living people
Khyber Pakhtunkhwa MPAs 2013–2018
Pakistan Tehreek-e-Insaf politicians
Year of birth missing (living people)